General elections were held in Trinidad and Tobago for the first time on 7 February 1925.

Background
The Legislative Council had been established in 1831, but was a fully nominated body. In July 1921, San Fernando Borough Council called a public meeting at Carnegie Library, the result of which was a unanimous request for elected representation. Similar demands subsequently came from Arima and Port of Spain. Within a few years, the British authorities agreed to a partly elected legislative council, although with voting limited to a restricted franchise.

Electoral system
The reorganised Legislative Council had 12 official members (civil servants), six nominated members, seven elected members and the Governor, who served as the legislature's speaker. The seven elected members were elected from single-member constituencies.

The franchise was limited to people who owned property in their constituency with a rateable value of $60 (or owned property elsewhere with a rateable value of $48) and tenants or lodgers who paid the same sums in rent. The voting age was 21 for men and 30 for women, and all voters were required to understand spoken English. Anyone who had received poor relief within the most recent six months before election day was disqualified from voting. Only 6% of the population were eligible to vote.

The restrictions on candidates were more severe, with candidature limited to men that lived in their constituency, were literate in English, and owned property worth at least $12,000 or from which they received at least $960 in rent a year. For candidates who had not lived in their constituency for at least a year, the property values were doubled.

Results
Voter turnout was around 29%, with two constituencies having only one candidate. Three of the seven elected members – Arthur Andrew Cipriani, Charles Henry Pierre and Albert Victory Stollmeyer – were supported by the Trinidad Workingmens' Association, as was the losing candidate in Tobago, Isaac Hope.

Appointed members

References

Trinidad
1925 in Trinidad and Tobago
Elections in Trinidad and Tobago